The 2008 FIM Ice Speedway World Championship was the 2008 version of FIM Individual Ice Racing World Championship season. The world champion was determined by six races hosted in three cities.

Classification

See also 
 2008 Team Ice Racing World Championship
 2008 Speedway Grand Prix in classic speedway

References 

Ice speedway competitions
World